Manfred Herweh (born 14 June 1954) is a German former professional motorcycle racer. He competed in Grand Prix motorcycle road racing from 1982 to 1989.

Motorcycle racing career
Herweh was born in Lampertheim, Hesse, Germany. He is notable for being the last competitor to win a 350cc Grand Prix race, at the 1982 German Grand Prix. He had his best year in 1984 when he won four races riding a Rotax-powered Real 250cc motorcycle. Herweh ended the season in second place behind Christian Sarron. He retired after the 1989 season.

From 1984, Herweh constructed motorcycles using frames from Nico Bakker and Rotax engines. These motorcycles competed in Grand Prix motorcycle racing using the chassis name "Real", due to a sponsorship agreement with a German hypermarket of the same name. Herweh's 1984 Grand Prix-winning motorcycle is on display at the Sinsheim Automobile and Technical Museum in Sinsheim, Germany.

Motorcycle Grand Prix results
Points system from 1969 to 1987:

Points system from 1988 to 1992:

(key) (Races in bold indicate pole position; races in italics indicate fastest lap)

References 

1954 births
Living people
German motorcycle racers
250cc World Championship riders
350cc World Championship riders
People from Lampertheim
Sportspeople from Darmstadt (region)